This is a list of Lincoln College people, including former students, Fellows, Honorary Fellows and Rectors of the college of the University of Oxford. This list is mostly male because women were only admitted to study at Lincoln in 1979.

Former students

Academics 
 Geoffrey Alderman (born 1944) — historian
 Hugh Hale Bellot (1890–1969) — Professor of American History and Vice-Chancellor, University of London (1951–53)
 David Denison (born 1950) — professor of linguistics
 Roger H. Martin (born 1943) — American college president
 Jeremy Waldron (born 1953) — legal and political philosopher 
 O. W. Wolters (1915–2000) — Malayan civil servant and pioneering historian of Southeast Asia
 Deborah Bowman (born 1968) — medical ethicist

Authors, actors, poets 

 Naomi Alderman (born 1974) — novelist
 Eve Best (born 1971) — actress
 William Davenant (1606–1688) — poet and playwright
 Sefton Delmer (1904–1970) — journalist and WWII propagandist
 James Essinger (born 1957) — writer
 Mohammad Ali Jouhar (1878–1931) — Indian Muslim leader, journalist and poet
 Osbert Lancaster (1908–1986) — cartoonist, critic and author
 John le Carré (1931–2020) — author, pen name of David Cornwell
 Emily Mortimer (born 1971) — actress
 Craig Mullaney (born c. 1978) — US Army veteran and author
 William Eugene Outhwaite (1847–1900) —  New Zealand writer, poet, and lawyer
 Tom Paulin (born 1949) — poet
 Francis Pilkington (1565–1638) — composer
 Dr. Seuss (Theodor Geisel) (1904–1991) — writer and cartoonist
 Kate Smurthwaite - comedienne
 Edward Thomas (1878–1917) — poet
Tom Ward (born 1971) — actor

Broadcasters 
 Suzannah Lipscomb (born 1978) — historian and television presenter
 Rachel Maddow (born 1973) — American television anchor and political analyst

Business 
 David Clementi (born 1949) — deputy governor of the Bank of England and Chairman of the BBC
 Sir Rod Eddington (born 1950) — chief executive of British Airways, 2000–2005
 Adebayo Ogunlesi (born 1953) — Chairman and Managing Partner of Global Infrastructure Partners
 Sir Peter Parker (1924–2002) — Chairman of the British Railways Board, 1976–1983
 Nicola Shaw (born 1968) — executive director of National Grid

Clerics 
 Thomas Brinknell
 Gregory Cameron (born 1959) — Bishop of St Asaph, Honorary Fellow
 Nathaniel Crewe, 3rd Baron Crewe (1633–1721) — Bishop of Oxford, Bishop of Durham, Rector of Lincoln College
 Robert Sanderson (1587-1663) - Bishop of Lincoln (1660-1663)
 Graham Tomlin (born 1958) — Bishop of Kensington
 William Richard Williams (1896–1962) — theologian
 Colin Winter (1928–1981) — bishop and anti-apartheid activist
 John Wraw (1959–2017) — Bishop of Bradwell

Military and intelligence 
 John Adye (born 1939) — former director of GCHQ
 David Craig, Baron Craig of Radley (born 1929) — House of Lords crossbencher and former Chief of the Defence Staff
 William Sholto Douglas (1893–1969) — RAF pilot and WWII military commander
 John Langdon, Royal Marine officer at D-Day, later became an Anglican priest
 Jamie Shea (born 1953) — NATO spokesman

Politicians 

 Peter Ainsworth (1956–2021) — Conservative MP for East Surrey
 Geoffrey Bing (1909–1977) — Labour MP for Hornchurch
 Bill Cash (born 1940) — Conservative MP for Stone
 Peter Durack (1926–2008) — Australian politician and Attorney-General of Australia
 Edward Fitzalan-Howard, 18th Duke of Norfolk (born 1956) — Earl Marshal
 Nick Hawkins (born 1957) — former MP (Conservative) for Blackpool South and Surrey Heath
 J.A. Hobson (1858–1940) — Liberal thinker and political theorist
 David Lewis (1909–1981) — Canadian MP and leader of the New Democratic Party
 James Lupton, Baron Lupton, Conservative peer
 Shabana Mahmood — Labour MP for Birmingham Ladywood since 2010
 John Morley (1838–1923) — Liberal statesman and writer
 Noel Newton Nethersole (1903–1959) — Jamaican cricketer and politician, founder of the Bank of Jamaica
 Chukwuemeka Ojukwu (1933–2011) — Biafran secessionist
 Daniel Poneman (born 1956) — United States Deputy Secretary of Energy
 Mel Reynolds (born 1952) — disgraced former United States Representative from Illinois
 Lee Rowley (born 1980) — Conservative MP for North East Derbyshire since 2017
 Oliver Smith (born 1993) — youngest branch party president in British political history for the Liberal Democrats
 Sir John Stanley (born 1942) — former MP for Tonbridge and Malling (Conservative)
 Rishi Sunak (born 1980) — Prime Minister of the United Kingdom (since 2022) and Conservative MP for Richmond (Yorks) since 2015
 [[Mahamudu Bawumia (born 1963) - Vice President of the republic of Ghana (since 2017)]]

Professionals 
 Sir Edmund Anderson (1530–1605) — Chief Justice of the Common Pleas
 Alistair Asprey — Secretary for Security for Hong Kong Government, Commanding Officer of Royal Hong Kong Auxiliary Air Force
 James Burge (1925–2010) — English criminal law barrister, original inspiration for the fictional barrister Rumpole of the Bailey
 Horace Byatt (1875–1933) — governor of Somaliland, Tanganyika, and Trinidad and Tobago
 Joseph Darracott (1934-1998) - art historian, museum curator and writer
 Nicholas Hilliard  (born 1959) — Common Serjeant of London
 Sir Donald Limon (1932–2012) – Clerk of the House of Commons
 Sir Andrew Longmore (born 1944) — Lord Justice of Appeal
 Simon McKie –  Advisory services chairman, writer and lecturer 
 Sir Robert Rogers (parliamentary official) (born 1950) – Clerk of the House of Commons

Sportsmen 
 Will Bratt (born 1988) — racing driver
 Steph Cook (born 1972) — modern pentathlete and Olympic gold medallist
 Rowland George (1905–1997) — rower and Olympic gold medallist

Academics, fellows and tutors

 Edward Abraham (Sir Edward) (Fellow 1948–1999)
 Peter Atkins (Fellow 1965–2007, Acting Rector 2007)
Cecile Fabre (Fellow 2010-2014)
 Howard Florey (Lord Florey) (Fellow 1934–1962)
 Vivian H. H. Green (Fellow 1951–2005, Rector 1983–1987)
 Susan Greenfield (Fellow 1985–present)
 Norman Heatley (Fellow 1948–1978, Supernumerary Fellow 1978–2004)
 Paul Langford (Fellow 1970–2015, Rector 2000–2012)
 Keith Murray (Fellow 1937–1993, Rector 1944–1953)
 Walter Fraser Oakeshott — Academic and discoverer of the Winchester Manuscript of Le Morte d'Arthur (Rector 1954–1972)
 Mark Pattison (Fellow 1839–1884, Rector 1861–1884)
 John Potter (Fellow 1694–1747)
 John Radcliffe (Fellow 1670–1675) 
 Sir Walter Baldwin Spencer (biologist and anthropologist)  (Fellow 1886;  Honorary Fellow 1916-1929)
 Nevil Sidgwick (Fellow 1901–1958)
 John Wesley — theologian and founder of Methodism

Honorary Fellows

References

Lincoln
 
 
 
People associated with Lincoln College, Oxford